Vasil Simeonov (Bulgarian: Васил Симеонов; born 4 February 1998) is a Bulgarian footballer who plays as a goalkeeper for Arda Kardzhali.

Career

Ludogorets Razgrad
Simeonov made his debut for the first team in the Bulgarian Cup match against Litex Lovech coming as a substitute in the 51st minute for the 7:0 win.

Career statistics

Club

References

External links
 

1998 births
Living people
Bulgarian footballers
First Professional Football League (Bulgaria) players
Second Professional Football League (Bulgaria) players
PFC Ludogorets Razgrad II players
PFC Ludogorets Razgrad players
FC Pirin Razlog players
FC Montana players
FC Arda Kardzhali players
Association football goalkeepers
People from Botevgrad
Sportspeople from Sofia Province